Harvest of Fire is an American mystery drama television film that premiered on CBS on April 21, 1996, as part of the Hallmark Hall of Fame anthology series. The film is directed by Arthur Allan Seidelman, from a teleplay by Richard Alfieri and Susan Nanus, and story by Nanus. It stars Lolita Davidovich as an FBI agent sent to investigate an arson in a peaceful Amish township, alongside J. A. Preston, Jean Louisa Kelly, Tom Aldredge, James Read, Craig Wasson, and Patty Duke. The film won a Primetime Emmy Award for its sound mixing.

Overview
The film was to some extent inspired by the arson of eight Amish barns that occurred in summer 1992 in Pennsylvania and that was investigated by the FBI as a hate crime. There are also similarities between Harvest of Fire and the 1985 film Witness.

Plot

FBI agent Sally Russwell (Lolita Davidovich) is sent to investigate a presumed hate crime in a small Amish community in Iowa after three barns are burnt down. Given a rather cool welcome by the locals when she arrives at the crime scene Sally is able to gain the confidence of Amish widow Annie Beiler (Patty Duke). A shaky but solid bond is formed between the two women which enables Sally to go on with her investigation. Slowly, Sally starts to learn more about Amish customs. She suspects an Amishman is behind the arson and asks to stay with Annie's family to get a deeper insight into the community. This results in Sally's discovering that Annie's daughter is seeing a young man whose father is being shunned for having built a barn not according to Amish rules.

Cast

 Lolita Davidovich as Sally Russell
 J. A. Preston as Sheriff Garrison
 Jean Louisa Kelly as Rachel
 Tom Aldredge as Jacob Hostetler
 James Read as Scott
 Craig Wasson as Philip Dixon
 Patty Duke as Annie Beiler
 Jeff Kizer as Lester
 Wesley Addy as Bishop Levi Lapp
 Gary Bisig as  Amos Zook
 Justin Chambers as George
 Jennifer Garner as Sarah Troyer
 Bette Henritze as Mary Lapp
 Catherine Kellner as Nancy
 Marta Kristen as Martha Troyer
 Gabriel Mann as John Beiler
 Eric Mabius as Sam Hostetler
 Sam Huntington as Nathan Hostetler
 Peter McRobbie as Reuben Troyer

Reception

Critical response
Todd Everett of Variety concluded his review by writing: "Scenery, filmed around Iowa City, is lovely and well-used, and performances are solid, if not spectacular. Amish, of course, are supposed to be restrained." Lynne Heffley of the Los Angeles Times called the film "uninspired" and stated: "The tale, directed by Arthur Allan Seidelman, unfolds without much suspense, but writers Richard Alfieri and Susan Nanus' respectful glimpse into Amish life is fascinating, and Duke does an admirable job as a quiet, dignified voice for Amish faith and community life. Davidovich fares less well, finding little to do with her cliched, sophisticated career-woman role except strike poses." Tom Jicha of the Sun-Sentinel described it as "a solid character-driven drama suitable for the entire family without being smarmy" and praised the performances of Duke and Davidovich, saying that they "bring out top performances."

Awards and nominations

References

External links
 
 
 

1996 films
1996 crime drama films
1996 television films
1990s American films
1990s English-language films
1990s mystery drama films
American drama television films
American crime drama films
American mystery drama films
Amish in films
CBS network films
Crime television films
Hallmark Hall of Fame episodes
Films about arson
Films about the Federal Bureau of Investigation
Films directed by Arthur Allan Seidelman
Films scored by Lee Holdridge
Films set on farms
Films set in Iowa
Films shot in Iowa
Sonar Entertainment films